Etheria is a popular Filipino sword and sorcery-themed live-action TV series.

Etheria may also refer to:

Etheria (bivalve), a species of freshwater mollusc in Africa and Madagascar
Etheria (She-Ra), the planet defended by the fictional heroine She-Ra in the She-Ra: Princess of Power animated series
Egeria (pilgrim), a female pilgrim from the late fourth century
An Ethereum-based project developed around 2015 that utilized NFTs
 The Etheria Film Night film festival showcase of new horror, science fiction, fantasy, action, and thriller films directed by women

See also
Etherian (disambiguation)